Aldana López is an Argentine boxer. She participated at the 2022 IBA Women's World Boxing Championships, being awarded the bronze medal in the minimumweight event. López was the first and only person of her country to win a medal.

References

External links 

Living people
Year of birth missing (living people)
Place of birth missing (living people)
Argentine women boxers
Mini-flyweight boxers
Light-flyweight boxers
AIBA Women's World Boxing Championships medalists
Competitors at the 2022 South American Games
South American Games medalists in boxing
South American Games bronze medalists for Argentina
21st-century Argentine women